Yo Quiero Bailar is a debut album of the Spanish singers Sonia & Selena. This album was a big success. It achieved gold and platinum certification in countries such as Spain, Latin America and Europe and sold over 1,000,000 copies there.

Track listing 
CD (Vale VLCD 091-1)
Yo quiero bailar
Deja que mueva, mueva, mueva
Que viva la noche
Cuando el sol se va
En tus manos mi destino
Mitad de la mitad
Mucho por vivir... en Gran Hermano
Tequila
DejarÉ
Mano a mano
No tengas miedo de amar
Yo quiero bailar (Extended version)

References

2001 debut albums